Reninus is a genus of clown beetles in the family Histeridae. There are about 13 described species in Reninus.

Species
These 13 species belong to the genus Reninus:

 Reninus amazoniae (Lewis, 1898)
 Reninus arechavaletae (Marseul, 1870)
 Reninus breyeri Bruch, 1940
 Reninus bruchi Reichensperger, 1927
 Reninus curvatus (Lewis, 1912)
 Reninus distinguendus Desbordes, 1923
 Reninus meticulosus (Lewis, 1885)
 Reninus puncticollis Lewis, 1907
 Reninus pygidialis (Reichensperger, 1926)
 Reninus salvini (Lewis, 1888)
 Reninus seminitens Schmidt, 1893
 Reninus turritus Lewis, 1902
 Reninus wagneri Desbordes, 1923

References

Further reading

 
 

Histeridae
Articles created by Qbugbot